Éric Berthou (born 23 January 1980) is a French former professional road bicycle racer, who currently manages amateur team Ty Raleigh. His sporting career began with BIC 2000.

Career
When R.A.G.T. Semences closed at the end of 2005, Berthou joined the Spanish ProTour squad .

In the spring of 2012, Berthou was in a solo breakaway in the Tro Bro Leon and observers thought he was in a good position to win until he faltered with fatigue during the last 10 kilometers, allowing Canadian Ryan Roth to take the victory. Berthou finished 12th in that race, with the main chase group, 37 seconds behind the winner.

Berthou retired at the end of the 2013 season, after eleven years as a professional, and joined the management team at his final professional outfit .

Major results

2002
 1st Ronde du Pays Basque
2004
 1st Stage 3 Paris–Corrèze
2012
 1st Val d'Ille Classic
 1st Stage 2 Tour de Bretagne
2013
 3rd Rutland–Melton International CiCLE Classic
 10th Grand Prix de la Ville de Lillers

References

External links

Cyclingbase Palmarès 

Sportspeople from Brest, France
Living people
French male cyclists
1980 births
Cyclists from Brittany